The following is a list of attacks on civilians attributed to armed groups under the control of the Sri Lankan government - Army, Navy, Air Force, Police, state organised mobs and paramilitary groups (Home Guards/Civil Defence Force, EPDP, PLOTE, TMVP Ukussa, Black Cats etc.). This list does not contain assassinations which are listed in a separate article.

The Sri Lankan Armed Forces which was almost exclusively made up of Sinhalese ethnicity during 30 year old Sri Lankan Civil War and the two JVP insurrections, has engaged in several counts of violence against civilians including numerous instances of civilian massacres, ethnic cleansing, pogroms, forced disappearances, sexual violence, destruction of property and assassination of civil leaders. Reports of torture, extra judicial killings and sexual violence against Tamils have also persisted in the post war period.

In opposition to this list, there is also the List of attacks attributed to the LTTE and the List of attacks on civilians attributed to the Janatha Vimukthi Peramuna.

Attacks in chronological order

See also
 List of attacks attributed to the LTTE
 List of attacks on civilians attributed to the Janatha Vimukthi Peramuna
 Lists of killings by law enforcement officers
 Sexual violence against Tamils in Sri Lanka

Notes

References

 

 
 
Human rights abuses in Sri Lanka
Sri Lanka
Sri Lankan Civil War-related lists
 
Military
War crimes in Sri Lanka
Lists of killings by law enforcement officers